The 2011 NCAA Division I baseball season, play of college baseball in the United States organized by the National Collegiate Athletic Association (NCAA) at the Division I level, began on February 18, 2011.  The season progressed through the regular season, many conference tournaments and championship series, and concluded with the 2011 NCAA Division I baseball tournament and 2011 College World Series.  The College World Series consisted of the eight remaining teams in the NCAA tournament.  Although it was held in its annual location of Omaha, Nebraska, it was played at the newly constructed TD Ameritrade Park for the first time.  It concluded on June 29, 2011, with the final game of the best of three championship series.  South Carolina defeated Florida two games to none to claim their second championship.

Realignment

Dropped programs
Duquesne dropped its varsity baseball program following the 2010 season.

Conference changes

New Orleans left the Sun Belt Conference to become a Division I independent.

Preseason

The South Carolina Gamecocks entered the season as defending World Series champions.  Among the four major baseball polls there were three different teams ranked preseason #1: the Florida Gators (Baseball America), TCU Horned Frogs (Collegiate Baseball, NCBWA), and UCLA Bruins (Coaches').

Conference standings

Conference winners and tournaments
Of the 31 conferences that sponsored Division I baseball in 2011, 28 sponsored conference tournaments or championship series.  With the exception of the Great West Conference, a provisional member of Division I, the winners of these tournaments received their conference's automatic bids to the NCAA Tournament.  Programs qualified for the conference tournaments based on their regular season against conference opponents, and tournament formats included double elimination, single elimination, and round robin.

College World Series 

The 2011 College World Series began on June 18, 2011 in Omaha, Nebraska.  It was the first College World Series in 61 years not played at Rosenblatt Stadium; games were played at TD Ameritrade Park Omaha.

Award winners

All-American teams

Major player of the year awards
Dick Howser Trophy: Taylor Jungmann, Texas
Baseball America: Trevor Bauer, UCLA
''Collegiate Baseball: Trevor Bauer, UCLAAmerican Baseball Coaches Association: Trevor Bauer, UCLAGolden Spikes Award Trevor Bauer, UCLA

Major coach of the year awardsAmerican Baseball Coaches Association: Ray Tanner, South CarolinaBaseball America: Kevin O'Sullivan, FloridaCollegiate Baseball Coach of the Year: Ray Tanner, South Carolina

Other major awardsJohnny Bench Award (Catcher of the Year): Jake Lowery, James MadisonBaseball America'' Freshman Of The Year: Colin Moran, North Carolina

See also
2011 Alabama Crimson Tide baseball team
2011 California Golden Bears baseball team
2011 South Carolina Gamecocks baseball team
2011 UCLA Bruins baseball team

References

External links 
Standings